Abrey Bongani "Aubrey" Ngoma (born 16 September 1989) is a South African football player who plays as a winger for Cape Town City in the Premier Soccer League.
He is a former Orlando Pirates and University of Pretoria player.

References

External links

1989 births
Living people
People from Hammanskraal
South African soccer players
Association football midfielders
South Africa international soccer players
Sportspeople from Gauteng
University of Pretoria F.C. players
Orlando Pirates F.C. players
Mpumalanga Black Aces F.C. players
Cape Town City F.C. (2016) players
Mamelodi Sundowns F.C. players
SuperSport United F.C. players
South African Premier Division players